Alpha-agarase (agarase, agaraseA33) is an enzyme with systematic name agarose 3-glycanohydrolase. This enzyme catalyses the following chemical reaction

 Endohydrolysis of (1->3)-alpha-L-galactosidic linkages in agarose, yielding agarotetraose as the major product

This enzyme requires Ca2+.

References

External links 
 

EC 3.2.1